The Egypt Civilization Party, or El-Hadara, is a small, secular, liberal political party established in Egypt in 2011. Formerly part of the Moderate Current Coalition, it describes itself as "in the center: in the right-wing economically, and left-wing socially."

The party was founded by Mohamed al-Sawy, one of the two Al-Hadara members to be elected to the People's Assembly in the 2011-2012 parliamentary elections. Another prominent party member is Hatem Khater, head of the Egyptian Food Bank.

References

2011 establishments in Egypt
Liberal parties in Egypt
Political parties established in 2011